Saxon-Sea Stadium is a multi-use stadium in the Saxonsea district of Atlantis, a town located 40 km north of Cape Town in South Africa. It is currently used mostly for football matches. In 2010 it was used as the home venue of Jomo Powers F.C., playing in the Western Cape province of Vodacom League.

Soccer venues in South Africa
Sports venues in the Western Cape
Multi-purpose stadiums in South Africa